Proverbs 8 is the eighth chapter of the Book of Proverbs in the Hebrew Bible or the Old Testament of the Christian Bible. The book is a compilation of several wisdom literature collections, with the heading in 1:1 may be intended to regard Solomon as the traditional author of the whole book, but the dates of the individual collections are difficult to determine, and the book probably obtained its final shape in the post-exilic period. This chapter is a part of the first collection of the book.

Text
The original text is written in Hebrew language. This chapter is divided into 36 verses.

Textual witnesses
Some early manuscripts containing the text of this chapter in Hebrew are of the Masoretic Text, which includes the Aleppo Codex (10th century), and Codex Leningradensis (1008). 

There is also a translation into Koine Greek known as the Septuagint, made in the last few centuries BC; some extant ancient manuscripts of this version include Codex Vaticanus (B; B; 4th century), Codex Sinaiticus (S; BHK: S; 4th century), and Codex Alexandrinus (A; A; 5th century).

Analysis
This chapter belongs to a section regarded as the first collection in the book of Proverbs (comprising Proverbs 1–9), known as "Didactic discourses". The Jerusalem Bible describes chapters 1–9 as a prologue of the chapters 10–22:16, the so-called "[actual] proverbs of Solomon", as "the body of the book". Anglican commentator T. T. Perowne, in the Cambridge Bible for Schools and Colleges, calls the section comprising chapters 1 to 9 "The Appeal of Wisdom", a title also reserved in particular for Proverbs 8.

The chapter contains the so-called "Wisdom's Second Speech" (the "First Speech" is in Proverbs 1:20–33), but whereas in Proverbs 1 Wisdom proclaims her value, and in Proverbs 3:19–26 Wisdom is the agent of creation, here Wisdom is personified, not as a deity like Egypt’s Ma'at or the Assyrian-Babylonian Ishtar,  but simply presented as a 'self-conscious divine being distinct but subordinate to God', which in reality is the personification of the attribute of wisdom displayed by God. A connection between Wisdom and Jesus Christ is only in that both reveals the nature of God, but Proverbs 8 states wisdom as a creation of God, while Jesus’ claims as one with God includes wisdom (Matthew 12:42; even personified wisdom in a way that was similar to Proverbs in Matthew 11:19) and a unique knowledge of God (Matthew 11:25-27). Paul the Apostle sees the fulfillment of wisdom in Christ (Colossians 1:15-20; 2:3) and affirms that Christ became believers' wisdom in the crucifixion (1 Corinthians 1:24, 30).

The chapter is very significant in Gnosticism, as they take “wisdom” to be referring to Sophia, the divine feminine incarnation of wisdom and truth.

The structure of chapter involves three cycles of Wisdom's invitation: 
An introduction (verses 1–3) precedes the first invitation (verses 4, 5) and explanation that she is noble, just, and true (6-9).
The second invitation (verse 10) is accompanied by an explanation that she is valuable (11–21).
Finally, Wisdom tells how she preceded and delights in creation (verses 22–31) before concluding with the third invitation (32–36).

Aitken divides this chapter into the following sections:
Verses 1–11: personified Wisdom assumes the role of a wisdom teacher.
Verses 12–21: Wisdom extols her providential role in the good and orderly government of the world (verses 12–16) and as the giver of wealth (verses 17–21)
Verses 22–26: Wisdom's hymn of self-praise: before creation
Verses 27–31: Wisdom's hymn of self-praise: at or during creation
Verses 32–36: Conclusion.

Wisdom's first invitation (8:1–9)
The introduction (verses 1–3) presents Wisdom as a teacher, without the note of reproach and threat in her first speech (Proverbs 1:20- 33). After giving the first invitation (verses 4–5), the emphasis is given on the character of Wisdom's words (verses 6–9) that, in contrast to the duplicitous and fraudulent words of the seductress, the words of Wisdom are in plain language, yet with integrity, which is intelligible to all who find her (verse 9).

Verse 1
Does not wisdom cry out,
and understanding lift up her voice?
Wisdom speaks openly and publicly, not in secret or steathily like the evil seductress, just as Jesus Christ said that he has spoken openly to the world and said nothing in secret (John 18:20).

Some translations and paraphrases treat personify "Wisdom" and "Understanding" as characters speaking out, for example in the New American Bible, Revised Edition:

and in The Voice translation:

Verse 2
On the heights, beside the way, at the crossroads she takes her stand.}}
American theologian Albert Barnes notes the contrast between Wisdom's openness and transparency, and the "stealth and secrecy and darkness" which had shrouded the harlot's enticements in chapter 7.

Verse 9
They are all plain to him who understands,
and right to those who find knowledge.
"Plain": literally in Hebrew "front of", that is "right in front of" someone.

Wisdom's second invitation (8:10–21)
The second invitation in verses 10–11 is very similar to the appeal in Proverbs:14–15, whereas verses 12–14 recall the words of the prologue of the book (Proverbs 1:2–7). In the explanation following the invitation, Wisdom describes her 'providential role in the good and orderly government of the world' (verses 12–16) and 'as the giver of wealth' (verses 17–21).

Wisdom's hymn (8:22–31)
The third invitation is preceded by a hymn of self-praise in two parts by Wisdom (verses 22–31): 
Wisdom's origins before creation (verses 22–26), and 
Wisdom's place at creation (verses 27–31). 
Wisdom describes herself as:
created by God (verse 22); from Hebrew word qanah meaning "create", as in Genesis 14:19, 22, or "procreate”, as in Genesis 4:1; also established or possessed.
setup or installed (verse 23); with royal overtones, cf. Psalm 2:6; may relate to a root meaning 'to be fashioned [in the womb]' (cf. Job 10:11; Psalm 139:13).
born (verses 24–25); consistently representing herself as a child of God.

Verse 31
rejoicing in the habitable part of His earth,
and my delights were with the sons of men.
"In the habitable part of His earth": from Hebrew ,  ; using two synonymous words to express a superlative idea—the “whole world” (cf. NIV, NCV).

Wisdom's third invitation (8:32–36)
Verses 32–36 form a conclusion in connection to the appeal back in verses 3–4.

See also

Related Bible parts: Proverbs 1, Proverbs 2, Proverbs 7, Proverbs 9

References

Sources

External links
 Jewish translations:
 Mishlei - Proverbs - Chapter 8 (Judaica Press) translation [with Rashi's commentary] at Chabad.org
 Christian translations:
 Online Bible at GospelHall.org (ESV, KJV, Darby, American Standard Version, Bible in Basic English)
 Book of Proverbs Chapter 8 King James Version
  Various versions

08